Nicholas Barese (November 29, 1986) is an American baseball coach and former pitcher, who is an assistant baseball coach of the UMass Lowell River Hawks. Barese played college baseball at Saint Anselm College from 2005 to 2009 for coaches J. P. Pyne and Barry Rosen and in Saint Anselm College for two seasons from 2009 to 2010. He then served as the head coach of the Merrimack (2015–2021).

Barese was born in Braintree, Massachusetts. He attended Braintree High School in Braintree. After graduation from high school, he attend Saint Anselm College to play football and baseball. Upon graduation from Saint Anselm, he continued his baseball career playing professionally for Rangers Redipuglia Baseball Club.

In 2015, Barese was named the head coach of the Merrimack Warriors baseball program, succeeding his Jim Martin.

Playing career
Barese was born in Braintree, Massachusetts. He attended Braintree High School in Braintree, and was a letterman in football, basketball, baseball and track.

Barese would go on to attend Saint Anselm College, while there he played both quarterback and pitched for the Hawks.

Barese would go on to play professional baseball for the Rangers Redipuglia Baseball Club.

Coaching career
Barese was named an assistant for Merrimack College in 2011.

In September, 2014, he was named the interim head coach of the Warriors after Jim Martin left the team to become an assistant at Rhode Island.

Barese was promoted to head coach in January, 2015. In July, 2021, Barese was fired.

In December 2021, Barese joined the coaching staff of the UMass Lowell River Hawks.

References

External links

 Merrimack Warriors profile

Living people
1986 births
Baseball coaches from Massachusetts
Merrimack Warriors baseball coaches
People from Braintree, Massachusetts
Rangers Redipuglia Baseball Club players
Saint Anselm Hawks baseball players
Saint Anselm Hawks football players
UMass Lowell River Hawks baseball coaches